Audrey L. Flack (born May 30, 1931) is an American artist. Her work pioneered the art genre of photorealism and encompasses painting, sculpture, and photography.

Flack has numerous academic degrees, including both a graduate and an honorary doctorate degree from Cooper Union in New York City.  Additionally she has a bachelor's degree in Fine Arts from Yale University and attended New York University Institute of Fine Arts where she studied art history. In May 2015, Flack received an honorary Doctor of Fine Arts degree from Clark University, where she also gave a commencement address.

Flack's work is displayed in several major museums, including the Museum of Modern Art, the Metropolitan Museum of Art, the Whitney Museum of American Art, and the Solomon R. Guggenheim Museum.  Flack's photorealistic paintings were the first such paintings to be purchased for the Museum of Modern Art’s permanent collection, and her legacy as a photorealist lives on to influence many American and International artists today. J. B. Speed Art Museum in Louisville, Kentucky, organized a retrospective of her work, and Flack’s pioneering efforts into the world of photorealism popularized the genre to the extent that it remains today.

Early life and education
Flack attended New York's High School of Music & Art. She studied fine arts in New York from 1948 to 1953, studying under Josef Albers among others.  She earned a graduate degree and received an honorary doctorate from Cooper Union in New York City, and a Bachelor of Fine Arts from Yale University. She studied art history at the Institute of Fine Arts, New York University. 
 1953 New York University Institute of Fine Arts, New York City 
 1952 BFA, Yale University, New Haven, Connecticut 
 1948-51 Cooper Union, New York City

Career

Flack's early work in the 1950s was abstract expressionist; one such painting paid tribute to Franz Kline. The ironic kitsch themes in her early work influenced Jeff Koons. But gradually, Flack became a New Realist and then evolved into photorealism during the 1960s. Her move to the photorealist style was in part because she wanted her art to communicate to the viewer. She was the first photorealist painter to be added to the collection of the Museum of Modern Art in 1966. Between 1976 and 1978 she painted her Vanitas series, including the piece Marilyn.

The critic Graham Thompson wrote,
"One demonstration of the way photography became assimilated into the art world is the success of photorealist painting in the late 1960s and early 1970s.  It is also called super-realism, radical realism, or hyper-realism and painters like Richard Estes, Denis Peterson, Flack, and Chuck Close often worked from photographic stills to create paintings that appeared to be photographs."

Art critic Robert C. Morgan writes in The Brooklyn Rail about Flack's 2010 exhibition at Gary Snyder Project Space, Audrey Flack Paints a Picture, "She has taken the signs of indulgence, beauty, and excess and transformed them into deeply moving symbols of desire, futility, and emancipation." In the early 1980s Flack's artistic medium shifted from painting to sculpture.  She describes this shift as a desire for "something solid, real, tangible. Something to hold and to hold on to."

Flack has claimed to have found the photorealist movement too restricting, and now gains much of her inspiration from Baroque art.

Flack is currently represented by the Louis K. Meisel Gallery and Hollis Taggart Galleries. Her work is held in the collections of museums around the world, including the Metropolitan Museum of Art, The Museum of Modern Art, the Solomon R. Guggenheim Museum, the Whitney Museum of American Art, the Allen Memorial Art Museum, and the National Gallery of Australia in Canberra, Australia.

She was awarded the St. Gaudens Medal from Cooper Union, and the honorary Albert Dome professorship from Bridgeport University. She is an honorary professor at George Washington University, is currently a visiting professor at the University of Pennsylvania and has taught and lectured extensively both nationally, and internationally.

In 1986 Flack published Art & Soul: Notes on Creating, a book expressing some of her thoughts on being an artist.

Her image is included in the iconic 1972 poster  Some Living American Women Artists by Mary Beth Edelson.

Photorealism
Audrey Flack is best known for her photo-realist paintings and was one of the first artists to use photographs as the basis for painting. The genre, taking its cues from Pop Art, incorporates depictions of the real and the regular, from advertisements to cars to cosmetics. Flack's work brings in everyday household items like tubes of lipstick, perfume bottles, Hispanic Madonnas, and fruit. These inanimate objects often disturb or crowd the pictorial space, which are often composed as table-top still lives. Flack often brings in actual accounts of history into her photorealist paintings, such as World War II' (Vanitas) and Kennedy Motorcade.  Women were frequently the subject of her photo-realist paintings.

Sculpture

Audrey Flack's sculpture is often overlooked in light of her better-known Photorealist paintings. In this interview, Flack discusses the fact that she is self-taught in sculpture. She incorporates religion and mythology into her sculpture rather than the historical or everyday subjects of her paintings. Her sculptures often demonstrate a connection to the female form, including a series of diverse, heroic women and goddess figures.  These depictions of women differ from those of traditional femininity, but rather are athletic, older, and strong. As Flack describes them: "they are real yet idealized... the 'goddesses in everywoman.'"

In the early 1990s, Flack was commissioned by a group called Friends of Queen Catherine to create a monumental bronze statue of Catherine of Braganza, in whose honor the borough of Queens is named. The statue, which would have been roughly the height of a nine-story building, was meant to be installed on the East River shore in the Hunters Point area of Long Island City, across from the United Nations. The project was never fully realized, however, as protestors in the mid-late 1990s objected to Queen Catherine's ties to the Transatlantic Slave Trade. (Others objected to the statue of a monarch overlooking a Revolutionary War battleground.) Flack nevertheless remained dedicated to the project, and notes that she endeavored to depict Catherine as biracial, reflecting her Portuguese background and paying homage to the ethnic diversity of the borough of Queens. Several preliminary models of the statue are now in public collections, including the Butler Institute of American Art and the Allen Memorial Art Museum.

Solo exhibitions
 2017 "Audrey Flack: Master Drawings from Crivelli," Hollis Taggart Galleries, New York, NY
 2015-2016   "Heroines: Audrey Flack's Transcendent Drawings and Prints," Williams Center Galleries, Lafayette College, PA; The Hyde Collection Art Museum & Historic House, Glens Falls, NY; The Butler Institute of American Art, Youngstown, OH
 2015   "Audrey Flack: The Abstract Expressionist Years," Hollis Taggart Galleries, New York, NY
 2012   "Audrey Flack: Sculpture, 1989-2012," Garth Greenan Gallery, New York, NY
 2010   "Audrey Flack Paints a Picture," Gary Snyder Gallery, New York, NY
 2007   "Daphne Speaks: An Exhibition of Sculpture and Master Workshop Prints,"  University of       North Dakota, Grand Forks, ND   
 2007   "Audrey Flack: Abstract Expressionist," Rider University Art Gallery, Lawrenceville, NJ   
 2007   "Plasters and Disasters - Audrey Flack's Recent Sculpture," Kingsborough Community College, NY   
 2002   "Drawings, Watercolors and Sculptures - Responses to 9/11," Vered Gallery, East Hampton, New York   
 2001   "Plein Air Watercolors and Drawings," Bernaducci-Meisel Gallery, New York, New York   
 1999   "Icons of the 20th Century," Savannah College of Art and Design, Savannah, Georgia   
 1998   "Audrey Flack - New Work," Louis K. Meisel Gallery, New York, New York 
 1996   "Daphne Speaks," Guild Hall Museum, East Hampton, New York   
 1996    "Amor Vincit Omnia," Art Museum of Western Virginia, Roanoke, Virginia

Public collections

Legacy and honors
 2007 	Honorary Ziegfeld Award, Keynote Speaker, National Art Education Association, New York City
 2004 	Honorary Doctorate, Lyme Academy of Art
 1995-96 	U.S. Government National Design for Transportation Award, presented by Jane Alexander, N.E.A. Chairman, and Federico Pena, Secretary of Transportation, awarded for the Rock Hill Gateway project
 1994 	Honorary Professor, George Washington University
 1989-93 	Member of the Board of Directors, College Art Association of America
 1985 	Artist of the Year Award, New York City Art Teachers Association
 1982 	Saint-Gaudens Medal, Cooper Union
 1977 	Cooper Union Citation and Honorary Doctorate
 1974 	Butler Institute of Art Award of Merit

Further reading
 Baskind, Samantha, Jewish Artists and the Bible in Twentieth-Century America,Philadelphia, PA, Penn State University Press, 2014, 
 Flack, Audrey, Thalia Gouma-Peterson, and Patricia Hills. Breaking the Rules: Audrey Flack, a Retrospective 1950-1990. New York: Harry N. Abrams, 1992.
 Mattison, Robert S., Audrey Flack: The Abstract Expressionist Years , New York, Hollis Taggart Galleries, 2015,  .
 Flack, Audrey, Art & Soul: Notes on Creating, New York, Dutton, 1986,

References

External links
 
"Audrey Flack: Breaking the Rules" 
Audrey Flack in the Indianapolis Museum of Art
Audrey Flack in National Gallery of Victoria 
Audrey Flack exhibition, the Guggenheim Museum
My Portrait of Anwar Sadat by Audrey Flack, Archives of American Art Blog, Smithsonian Institution
Oral history interview with Audrey Flack, 2009 Feb. 16, Archives of American Art, Smithsonian Institution
Audrey Flack Biography: Hollis Taggart Galleries

20th-century American painters
21st-century American painters
Feminist artists
Yale University alumni
New York University Institute of Fine Arts alumni
1931 births
Living people
University of Pennsylvania staff
Painters from New York (state)
20th-century American sculptors
20th-century American women artists
21st-century American women artists
American women printmakers
20th-century American printmakers
American women painters
The High School of Music & Art alumni
Photorealist artists
Sculptors from New York (state)